The Israeli occupation of the Sinai Peninsula was a 15-year-long military occupation of the Sinai Peninsula by Israeli forces that occurred after Israel's seizure of the region from Egypt during the 1967 Arab–Israeli War. Israeli provisional control over the Sinai Peninsula ended in 1982 following the implementation of the 1979 Egypt–Israel peace treaty, which saw Israel return the region to Egypt in exchange for the latter's recognition of Israel as a legitimate sovereign state.

A total of 18 Israeli settlements were established in the region during the occupation, primarily along the Gulf of Aqaba and in the northeast portions located south of the Gaza Strip.

The Sinai Peninsula was returned to Egypt in multiple stages beginning in 1979 as part of the Egypt–Israel peace treaty. Israel dismantled 18 settlements, 2 airforce bases, a naval base, and other installations by 1982, including most oil resources under Israeli control.

History
Israeli forces first seized the Egyptian Sinai Peninsula during the Suez Crisis of October–November 1956. Under heavy international pressure, Israeli forces withdrew in March 1957, after heavily mapping the territory and placing secret supply caches in preparation for the next war. As part of the conditions for the Israeli withdrawal, the Sinai Peninsula was demilitarized and the UNEF peacekeeping force was established there to police the border between Israel and Egypt. In May 1967, Egyptian President Gamal Abdel Nasser ordered the withdrawal of this force and moved Egypt's own troops into the area. Israel, believing war to be imminent, ultimately launched a preemptive strike against Egypt, beginning the Six-Day War. Within three days, Israel had occupied most of the Sinai Peninsula.

Following the Israeli capture and occupation of the Sinai Peninsula, Egypt launched the War of Attrition (1967–1970) aimed at forcing Israel to withdraw from the Sinai Peninsula. The war saw protracted conflict in the Suez Canal Zone, ranging from limited to large scale combat. Israeli shelling of the cities of Port Said, Ismailia, and Suez on the west bank of the canal, led to high civilian casualties (including the virtual destruction of Suez), and contributed to the flight of 700,000 Egyptian internal refugees. Ultimately, the war concluded in 1970 with no change in the front line. On 6 October 1973, Egypt commenced Operation Badr to retake the Sinai Peninsula, while Syria launched a simultaneous operation to retake the Golan Heights, thereby beginning the Yom Kippur War (known in Egypt and much of Europe as the October War). The canal was reopened in 1975, with President Sadat leading the first convoy through the canal aboard an Egyptian destroyer. In 1979, Egypt and Israel signed a peace treaty in which Israel agreed to withdraw from the entirety of the Sinai Peninsula. Israel subsequently withdrew in several stages, ending on 26 April 1982.

Israeli settlements in Sinai

Israeli settlements in the Sinai Peninsula were split into two regions: one along the Mediterranean coast, and another along the Gulf of Aqaba. Israel had plans to expand the settlement of Yamit into a city of up to 200,000 residents. The actual population of Yamit never exceeded 3,000. The settlements in the Yamit region were demolished by Israel prior to the withdrawal, but the settlements on the gulf: Ofira (Sharm el-Sheikh), Di Zahav (Dahab), and Neviot (Nuweiba) remained intact, and were further developed by Egypt after the withdrawal.

Yamit region
 Yamit
 Avshalom, Sinai
 Netiv HaAsara, Sinai
 Holit
 Dikla
 Pri'el, Sinai
 Sufa, Sinai
 Talmei Yosef, Sinai

Gulf region
 Di Zahav (Dahab)
 Neviot (Nuweiiba)
 Ofira (Sharm El Sheikh)
 Aviya Sonesta Beach Hotel (Taba)

See also
 Israeli occupation of Southern Lebanon
 Israeli-occupied territories
 Closure of the Suez Canal (1967–1975)

References

Sinai Peninsula
Arab–Israeli conflict
Egypt–Israel relations